Ammavra Ganda is a 1997 Indian Kannada-language] romantic comedy film directed by Phani Ramachandra and produced by M. K. Srinivasamurthy. The film stars Shiva Rajkumar, Bhagyashree of Maine Pyar Kiya fame in her debut Kannada film and Suman Nagarkar in lead roles.

Cast 

 Shiva Rajkumar as Raju
 Bhagyashree as Rani
 Suman Nagarkar as Bindu
 Balaraj
 Vijay Kashi 
 Loknath 
 Mukhyamantri Chandru 
 Shivaram
 Sihi Kahi Chandru
 Girija Lokesh
 Rekha Das
 Sithara in Cameo

Soundtrack 
The soundtrack of the film was composed by Raj.

Reception
Times of India wrote "
Whatever has happened to Phani Ramachandra? Of course, he was never the master of the large canvas, never had artistic pretensions, never made a great film. But he had his ear to the pulse of the average cinemagoer he could twist formula quite cleverly to make us laugh. Each time you came out of a Phani film, you thought, not bad, but let’s hope he betters himself next time. His Gowri Ganesha, for instance, was hugely popular. Ammavara Ganda had immense promise as a rib-tickle". The Hindu wrote "Overall, although “Ammavra Ganda” is a comedy in patches, thanks only to Shiva Rajkumar, it is not a film with a definite social message as it is made to believe by the director; if anything, it is a bit of a spoof on women's clamour for equality. Unwittingly, Phani Ramachandra also reveals the sad state of a woman's world which is confined to a stereotyped, limited role."

References

External links 
 Ammavra Ganda Kannada movie details

1997 films
1990s Kannada-language films
Indian romantic comedy films
Films directed by Phani Ramachandra